Certosa di San Giacomo was a Carthusian monastery, founded in 1363 by Giacomo Arcucci on the island of Capri, Campania, southern Italy. It is now a museum and is used for cultural events. The buildings that formed the charterhouse have three main areas: the pharmacy and women's church, the buildings for monks, and those for guests. The cloister (Chiostro Grande) is of a late Renaissance design, while the Chiostro Piccolo features Roman marble columns.

History

Count Giacomo Arcucci, a secretary to Joan I of Naples, established the charterhouse in 1371. He later became a monk himself in 1386.

In 1553 the monastery was restored and fortified and a tower was erected which collapsed in the 18th century.

There was often conflict between the islanders and the monks, who owned land as well as grazing and hunting rights. During the 1656 plague in Capri, the monks sealed themselves off, whereupon the islanders threw their corpses over the wall of the monastery in retribution.

Since 1974 the charterhouse houses the Karl Wilhelm Diefenbach museum among others and is used for cultural events. A high school is also on the premises.

References

External links
Official website 

Buildings and structures in Capri, Campania
1363 establishments in Europe
14th-century establishments in Italy

Monasteries in Campania
Carthusian monasteries in Italy